Serhiy N. Morozov (Serhiy Mykolayovych Morozov; born 15 January 1961) is a former professional footballer from Ukraine. He became topscorer of the Meistriliiga 1994–95 (Estonian Premier League) by scoring 25 goals for Lantana Marlekor. He also played as a professional in Latvia. His last club was Olimpia Yuzhnoukrainsk from Ukraine. As of 2006, Morozov was working as a youth coach at MFC Mykolaiv.

Awards and honours
 Soviet Cup: 1980, 1983
 USSR Super Cup: 1983
 Meistriliiga top goalscorer: 1994–95

References

External links
Statistics at FFU website
Statistics at klisf.info
ukrainianfootball

1961 births
Living people
Sportspeople from Mariupol
Soviet footballers
Ukrainian footballers
Ukrainian expatriate footballers
Expatriate footballers in Hungary
Expatriate footballers in Latvia
Expatriate footballers in Estonia
FC Shakhtar Donetsk players
SKA Kiev players
PFC CSKA Moscow players
FC Mariupol players
FC Nyva Vinnytsia players
SC Tavriya Simferopol players
FC Metalurh Zaporizhzhia players
MFC Mykolaiv players
FC Lantana Tallinn players
FC Krystal Kherson players
FC Enerhiya Yuzhnoukrainsk players
Ukrainian Premier League players
Association football forwards
Ukrainian expatriate sportspeople in Estonia
Ukrainian expatriate sportspeople in Latvia
Ukrainian expatriate sportspeople in Hungary
Meistriliiga players